George Grimmer (February 28, 1827March 16, 1907) was a Canadian American immigrant, lumberman, politician, and Wisconsin pioneer.  He served in the Wisconsin State Senate for four years, representing the 1st State Senate district—northeastern Wisconsin.

Biography
Grimmer was born on February 28, 1827, in Saint David Parish, New Brunswick, then part of British North America. He emigrated to the United States, and, in 1850, he moved to Shawano, Wisconsin, to work as a lumberman.  Three years later, he moved to Kewaunee, Wisconsin, where he remained for the rest of his life.

In Kewaunee, he served as chairman of the town board for several years, and was chairman of the Kewaunee County Board of Supervisors.

In 1876, he was elected to the Wisconsin State Senate, running on the Republican Party ticket.  He represented Wisconsin's 1st State Senate district which then comprised Door, Kewaunee, Marinette, Oconto, and Shawano counties.  He was re-elected in 1878, serving through 1880.  He did not run for a third term in 1880.

He died on March 16, 1907, at his home in Kewaunee.

Electoral history

Wisconsin Senate (1876, 1878)

| colspan="6" style="text-align:center;background-color: #e9e9e9;"| General Election, November 7, 1876

| colspan="6" style="text-align:center;background-color: #e9e9e9;"| General Election, November 5, 1878

References

Colony of New Brunswick people
Pre-Confederation Canadian emigrants to the United States
People from Shawano, Wisconsin
People from Kewaunee, Wisconsin
County supervisors in Wisconsin
Republican Party Wisconsin state senators
1827 births
1907 deaths
19th-century American politicians